The Raigam Tele'es Most Popular Actor Award is presented annually in Sri Lanka by the Kingdom of Raigam for the most Popular Sri Lankan television actor of the year, determined by a publicly popular vote.

The award was first given in 2007. Following is a list of the winners of this award since 2007.

Award winners

References

Popular Actor
Television acting awards